Auguste Raux (born 7 November 1954) is a French football coach who last managed the Madagascar national team.

Career
Raux has managed the Madagascar national team during three spells - in 2003, from 2013 to 2015, and from June 2016 onwards. He also managed club sides AS Adema and USJF Ravinala.

References

1954 births
Living people
French football managers
Madagascar national football team managers
French expatriate football managers
French expatriate sportspeople in Madagascar
Expatriate football managers in Madagascar